Neoaves is a clade that consists of all modern birds (Neornithes or Aves) with the exception of Paleognathae (ratites and kin) and Galloanserae (ducks, chickens and kin). Almost 95% of the roughly 10,000 known species of extant birds belong to the Neoaves.

The early diversification of the various neoavian groups occurred very rapidly around the Cretaceous–Paleogene extinction event, and attempts to resolve their relationships with each other have resulted initially in much controversy.

Phylogeny
The early diversification of the various neoavian groups occurred very rapidly around the Cretaceous–Paleogene extinction event. As a result of the rapid radiation, attempts to resolve their relationships have produced conflicting results, some quite controversial, especially in the earlier studies. Nevertheless, some recent large phylogenomic studies of Neoaves have led to much progress on defining orders and supraordinal groups within Neoaves. Still, the studies have failed to produce to a consensus on an overall high order topology of these groups. A genomic study of 48 taxa by Jarvis et al. (2014) divided Neoaves into two main clades, Columbea and Passerea, but an analysis of 198 taxa by Prum et al. (2015) recovered different groupings for the earliest split in Neoaves. A reanalysis with an extended dataset by Reddy et al. (2017) suggested this was due to the type of sequence data, with coding sequences favouring the Prum topology. The disagreement on topology even with large phylogenomic studies led Suh (2016) to propose a hard polytomy of nine clades as the base of Neoaves. An analysis by Houde et al. (2019) recovered Columbea and a reduced hard polytomy of six clades within Passerea.

Despite other disagreements, these studies do agree on a number of supraorderal groups, which Reddy et al. (2017) dubbed the "magnificent seven", which together with three "orphaned orders" make up Neoaves. Significantly, they both include a large waterbird clade (Aequornithes) and a large landbird clade (Telluraves). The groups defined by Reddy et al. (2017) are as follows:
 The "magnificent seven" supraordinal clades:
 Telluraves (landbirds)
 Aequornithes (waterbirds)
 Eurypygimorphae (sunbittern, kagu and tropicbirds)
 Otidimorphae (turacos, bustards and cuckoos)
 Strisores (nightjars, swifts, hummingbirds and allies)
 Columbimorphae (mesites, sandgrouse and pigeons)
 Mirandornithes (flamingos and grebes) 
 The three orphaned orders:
 Opisthocomiformes (hoatzin)
 Gruiformes (cranes and rails)
 Charadriiformes (shorebirds, gulls and alcids)
  	

The following cladogram illustrates the proposed relationships between all neoavian bird clades. This consensus phylogeny of birds is based on phylogenomic data, reflecting a recent phylogenomic supertree analysis and modified after two more recent phylogenomic studies.

References

Neognathae
Bird superorders
Extant Campanian first appearances